"Romantic Rights" is the first single from Death from Above 1979's debut album You're a Woman, I'm a Machine. Released in 2004, it reached number 57 on the UK Singles Chart. Prior to the band's first name change, a self-titled extended play was released on April 13, 2004, consisting of four songs.

The song plays as the intro to, and throughout, the MTV show Human Giant. The song appears on the soundtrack for video games SSX On Tour and NBA 2K15, the latter which was curated by music producer Pharrell Williams. The band played "Romantic Rights" on Late Night with Conan O'Brien, with Grainger drumming for the first half of the performance and Late Night's Max Weinberg on the same drum set for the second.

Track listing

7" vinyl 
679 – 679L090

12" vinyl 
679 – 679L090T

Extended play 

The EP consists of four songs including two early versions of songs from You're a Woman, I'm a Machine, one song exclusive to the EP and a remix of the title track. It was released by Sound Virus Records in the United States.

Track listing

Personnel
Death from Above

Jesse F. Keeler – bass guitar, synthesizer
Sebastien Grainger – drums, vocals

Additional

Scott Soares – percussion on "Romantic Rights" (Girlsareshort Remix)
Al Puodziukas – engineering, recording, production on "Romantic Rights" (Girlsareshort Remix)
Dan Zabawa – recording and production on "Romantic Rights" (Girlsareshort Remix)
Brian Roettinger – design
Eva Michon – photography

Charts

References

External links
Press reviews of Death from Above 1979

2004 songs
Death from Above 1979 songs